The 1924 Delaware Fightin' Blue Hens football team was an American football team that represented the University of Delaware in the 1924 college football season. In their third season under head coach William McAvoy, the Blue Hens compiled a 4–3–1 record and were outscored by a total of 45 to 44. The team played its home games at Frazer Field in Newark, Delaware.

Schedule

References

Delaware
Delaware Fightin' Blue Hens football seasons
Delaware Fightin' Blue Hens football